The 2018 cycling season began in Australia at the Tour Down Under for Trek-Segafredo in January.

As a UCI WorldTeam, they are automatically invited and obliged to send a squad to every event in the UCI World Tour.

2018 roster

Riders who joined the team for the 2018 season

Riders who left the team during or after the 2017 season

Season victories

National, Continental and World Champions 2018

Footnotes

References

External links

 

Trek–Segafredo (men's team)
Trek-Segafredo
Trek-Segafredo season